The 2012 Irwin Tools Night Race was a NASCAR Sprint Cup Series stock car race held on August 25, 2012 at Bristol Motor Speedway in Bristol, Tennessee. Contested over 500 laps, it was the twenty-fourth race of the 2012 NASCAR Sprint Cup Series season.

Denny Hamlin of Joe Gibbs Racing won the race, his first at Bristol and third of the 2012 season. Jimmie Johnson finished second and Jeff Gordon was third. Nearly 150,000 people attended this 189-minute racing event.

This race was broadcast on ABC (through ESPN on ABC), but was not available in all areas.  A handful of ABC affiliates aired NFL preseason football games, with most of the affected affiliates preempting the race altogether, although at least one joined the race in progress in its final hour.  Because of this, WOTV in Battle Creek, Michigan was the only West Michigan ABC affiliate airing the race, as WZZM-TV in Grand Rapids, Michigan was simulcasting WXYZ-TV in Southfield, Michigan's Detroit Lions coverage and, unlike WXYZ-TV, chose not to join the race in progress, choosing to air syndicated programming instead.

Qualifying
Sprint Cup qualifying was to begin on August 24 at 5:00pm EST after the Nationwide Series qualifying. Just before the Cup cars were to take their laps, rain poured on the track. As the Cup cars were unable to make time and with the Nationwide race to run on Friday night, NASCAR cancelled qualifying and set the field according to the following criteria: The field would consist of the Top 35 in owner's points and those with the most attempts. In the event that multiple teams have the same number of starts, preference is given to the team higher in owner's points. The field would be set by their lap times during the practice session.

As a result, Casey Mears, at a time of 15.701 seconds, won the pole, followed by Brad Keselowski, Greg Biffle, Joey Logano, and Aric Almirola. Four drivers would not race due to the number of attempts: Scott Speed, Kelly Bires, J. J. Yeley, and Reed Sorenson.

Top 10 finishers

References

NASCAR races at Bristol Motor Speedway
Irwin Tools Night Race
Irwin Tools Night Race
Irwin Tools Night Race